2005 and 2006 saw the 3rd edition of Arab Champions League. 32 teams represented Arab nations from Africa and Asia.

Raja CA of Morocco won the final against ENPPI of Egypt.

The System 
 Round 32: Knock out stage
 Round 16: Knock out stage
 Quarter-Finals: Knock out Stage
 Semifinals and final: Knock out stage

Round of 32 
32 teams play home and away matches as Knock out stage.

 

 

|}

 1 Both legs in Manama, Bahrain
 2 First leg in Damascus, Syria
 3 Second leg in Damascus, Syria
 4 Both legs in Amman, Jordan

Round 16 
16 teams play home and away matches as Knock out stage.

|}

 1 Second leg in Amman, Jordan
 2 Second leg in Damascus, Syria

Quarter-finals 
8 teams play home and away matches as Knock out stage.

|}

Semi-finals 

|}
 1  Al-Hilal were sanctioned with a 3-0 loss after the pitch was invaded and the referee was assaulted by the club's supporters.

Final 

|}

Champions

Prize money

References

External links
Arab Champions' League 2005/06 – rsssf.com

Arab Champions League, 2007–08
Arab Champions League, 2007–08
Arab Champions League, 2007–08
Arab Champions League, 2007–08
Arab Club Champions Cup